The following is a list of the world's largest manufacturing companies, ordered by revenue in millions of U.S. dollars according to the Fortune Global 500. Currently the 50 biggest companies by revenue are included.

2022

2020
*Revenue with asterisk(s) aren't found or confused according to Fortune Global 500 in the year 2020.

See also

 Fortune Global 500
 Economy of the United States
 List of largest employers
 List of largest private non-governmental companies by revenue
 List of the largest software companies
 List of largest Internet companies
 List of largest companies by revenue
 List of largest technology companies by revenue

References 
 CNN Money - Fortune Global 500

Largest
Economy-related lists of superlatives